

Chronology 
1776 raised for the Vizier of Oude under Captain Baillie
1777 incorporated in HEIC service as the 27th Regiment of Bengal Native Infantry
1781 became the 20th Regiment of Bengal Native Infantry
1784 became the 23rd Regiment of Bengal Native Infantry
1786 became the 23rd Battalion of Bengal Native Infantry
1796 became the 2nd Battalion 5th Regiment of Bengal Native Infantry
1824 became the 20th Regiment of Bengal Native Infantry 
1857 Mutinied at Meerut 10 May

In 1861, after the mutiny, the title was given to the 8th Regiment of Punjab Infantry

References

Honourable East India Company regiments
Bengal Native Infantry